is a Japanese corporation established in 2015. Kansai Airports is a member of the Kansai Airports Group, which includes eight companies.

Kansai Airports is currently operating three airports in Japan, Kansai International Airport, Osaka International Airport and Kobe Airport. The operation rights of Kansai International Airport and Osaka International Airport were transferred to Kansai Airports from New Kansai International Airport Co., Ltd. (NKIAC) on the 1st of April 2016. On the 1st of April 2018, Kansai Airports Kobe, a wholly owned subsidiary of Kansai Airports, took over the operation of Kobe Airport from Kobe City.

Mission
The company's mission according to its official website is:

Ownership
The shareholders' percentage ownership of Kansai Airports are ORIX 40%, VINCI Airports 40% and the rest 20% is shared among ASICS Corporation; Iwatani Corporation; Osaka Gas Co., Ltd.; Obayashi Corporation; OMRON Corporation; The Kansai Electric Power Company, Incorporated; Kintetsu Group Holding Co., Ltd.; Keihan Holdings Co.,Ltd.; Suntory Holdings Limited; JTB Corp.; Sekisui House, Ltd.; Daikin Industries, Ltd.; Daiwa House Industry Co., Ltd.; Takenaka Corporation; Nankai Electric Railway Co., Ltd.; Nippon Telegraph and Telephone West Corporation; Panasonic Corporation; Hankyu Hanshin Holdings, Inc.; Rengo Co., Ltd.; The Senshu Ikeda Bank, Ltd.; Kiyo Holdings, Inc.; The Bank of Kyoto, Ltd.; The Shiga Bank，Ltd.; The Nanto Bank, Ltd.; Nippon Life Insurance Company; Mizuho Bank, Ltd.; Sumitomo Mitsui Trust Bank, Ltd.; MUFG Bank, Ltd.; Resona Bank, Ltd.; and the Private Finance Initiative Promotion Corporation of Japan.

List of Kansai Airports Group companies
As of April 1, 2019, the Kansai Airports Group consists of the following companies:
 Kansai Airports
 Kansai Airports Retail & Services
 Kansai Airports Operation Services
 Kansai Airports Technical Services
 CKTS Co., Ltd.
 KIA Heating & Cooling Supply Co., Ltd.
 World Air Passenger Service Co., Ltd.
 Kansai Airports Kobe

Gallery

References

External links

 Kansai Airports
 Kansai Airports 

Japanese companies established in 2015
Transport companies established in 2015
Companies based in Osaka Prefecture
Multinational joint-venture companies
Airport operators of Japan